Rabun is an unincorporated community in Baldwin County, Alabama, United States.

History
The community is named in honor of the Rabon family, who were early settlers of the area. A post office operated under the name Rabun from 1916 to 1959.

References

Unincorporated communities in Baldwin County, Alabama
Unincorporated communities in Alabama